Saint Lucia competed at the 2016 Summer Olympics in Rio de Janeiro, Brazil, from 5 to 21 August 2016. This was the nation's sixth consecutive appearance at the Summer Olympics.

Saint Lucia Olympic Committee sent a team of five athletes, two men and three women, to compete only in sailing, swimming, and track and field at the Games, matching the nation's roster size with Sydney 2000 and beating the record by a single athlete set in both Beijing 2008 and London 2012. Two Saint Lucian athletes were awarded universality places to compete in their respective sporting events, while the rest of the team qualified directly for the Games on merit.

High jumper and Pan American Games champion Levern Spencer spearheaded the Saint Lucian delegation for the third consecutive time, as the oldest and most experienced competitor (aged 32) and the nation's flag bearer in the opening ceremony. Other notable athletes on the roster featured Spencer's teammate Jeanelle Scheper and ex-NFL running back turned track sprinter Jahvid Best. Saint Lucia, however, has yet to win its first ever Olympic medal.

Athletics (track and field)
 
Athletes from Saint Lucia have so far achieved qualifying standards in the following athletics events (up to a maximum of 3 athletes in each event):

Track & road events

Field events

Sailing
 
Saint Lucia has received an invitation from the Tripartite Commission to send a sailor competing in the Laser Radial class to the Olympics.

M = Medal race; EL = Eliminated – did not advance into the medal race

Swimming

Saint Lucia has received a Universality invitation from FINA to send a male swimmer to the Olympics.

See also
Saint Lucia at the 2015 Pan American Games

References

External links 
 

Nations at the 2016 Summer Olympics
2016
2016 in Saint Lucian sport